Oswaldo Celestino Arcia (born May 9, 1991) is a Venezuelan professional baseball outfielder for the Toros de Tijuana of the Mexican League. He previously played in Major League Baseball (MLB) for the Minnesota Twins, Tampa Bay Rays, Miami Marlins, and San Diego Padres. He also played in Nippon Professional Baseball (NPB) for the Hokkaido Nippon-Ham Fighters.

Professional career
Arcia signed with the Minnesota Twins as an amateur free agent in 2007. He was added to the team's 40 man roster on November 18, 2011.

Arcia was the Twins Minor League Hitter of the Year in 2012 after hitting .320/.388/.539 with 17 home runs and 98 runs batted in (RBIs).

Minnesota Twins
Arcia was called up to the majors for the first time on April 15, 2013. He went 1-for-3 in his Major League debut. On April 23, Arcia hit his first career major league home run off Jose Fernandez of the Miami Marlins. Arcia finished the season batting .251/.304/.430 with 14 home runs in 97 games. Arcia displayed poor plate discipline and showed a knack for swinging at the first pitch in an at bat. He struck out 117 times in 303 at bats and played left and right field for the Twins. 

Arcia began the 2014 season as the starting right fielder for the Twins. He played in right before going on the DL with a wrist injury. He missed over a month due to the injury and was activated from the DL at the end of May. In 103 games, he slashed .231/.300/.452, slugging 20 home runs and amassing 57 RBIs.
Arcia played in 19 games for the Twins in 2015.  On June 3, he was demoted to Triple-A where he finished the year with the Rochester Red Wings. He batted .276/.338/.379 in 65 big league plate appearances, with two home runs and eight RBIs.

On June 16, 2016, Arcia was designated for assignment by the Twins to create room for Danny Santana, who was activated from the disabled list.

Tampa Bay Rays

On June 24, the Twins traded Arcia to the Tampa Bay Rays for a player to be named later. Arcia played 21 games for the Rays, before being designated for assignment on August 19, 2016.

Miami Marlins
On August 23, the Marlins claimed Arcia off waivers and assigned him to their major league roster. After receiving two plate appearances with the Marlins across two games, they designated him for assignment on August 25, after acquiring Jeff Francoeur.

San Diego Padres
Arcia was claimed off waivers by the San Diego Padres on August 27. He was released on November 21, 2016.

Arizona Diamondbacks
On December 20, 2016, Arcia signed a minor league contract with the Arizona Diamondbacks. He elected free agency on November 6, 2017.

Hokkaido Nippon-Ham Fighters
Arcia signed a one-year, $1.16 million contract with the Hokkaido Nippon-Ham Fighters  on December 15, 2017.

Diablos Rojos del México
On February 15, 2019, Arcia signed with the Diablos Rojos del México of the Mexican League.

Guerreros de Oaxaca
On May 3, 2019, Arcia was traded to the Guerreros de Oaxaca of the Mexican League. He was released on July 24, 2019.

Olmecas de Tabasco
On July 27, 2019, Arcia signed with the Olmecas de Tabasco of the Mexican League. He was released on August 13, 2019.
After the 2019 season, he played for Caribes de Anzoátegui of the Liga Venezolana de Béisbol Profesional(LVMP).

After the 2020 season, he played for Caribes of the LVMP. He has also played for Venezuela in the 2021 Caribbean Series.

Cleburne Railroaders
On February 23, 2022, Arcia signed with the Cleburne Railroaders of the American Association.

Toros de Tijuana
On December 17, 2022, Arcia signed with the Toros de Tijuana of the Mexican League.

Personal life
His younger brother, Orlando Arcia, is currently a shortstop for the Atlanta Braves.

See also
 List of Major League Baseball players from Venezuela

References

External links

1991 births
Living people
Beloit Snappers players
Caribes de Anzoátegui players
Charlotte Stone Crabs players
Diablos Rojos del México players
Dominican Summer League Twins players
Venezuelan expatriate baseball players in the Dominican Republic
Elizabethton Twins players
Fort Myers Miracle players
Guerreros de Oaxaca players
Gulf Coast Twins players
Hokkaido Nippon-Ham Fighters players
Major League Baseball players from Venezuela
Major League Baseball outfielders
Miami Marlins players
Minnesota Twins players
New Britain Rock Cats players
Nippon Professional Baseball outfielders
Olmecas de Tabasco players
People from Anzoátegui
San Diego Padres players
Tampa Bay Rays players
Tigres de Aragua players
Reno Aces players
Rochester Red Wings players
Venezuelan expatriate baseball players in Japan
Venezuelan expatriate baseball players in Mexico
Venezuelan expatriate baseball players in the United States